ZIV International was an American production and distribution company founded in 1971 by Irv Holender. In the late 1970s and early 1980s, it distributed Americanised versions of European animated cartoons and Japanese anime series, and produced and distributed celebrity biographies. WorldCat recognises 83 works in 97 publications.

Holender sold his company and library to Lorimar Productions in 1982, the library contents were sold to Coral Pictures in 1986.

Shows produced or distributed
The following television shows were distributed and/or produced by ZIV International. Production credits typically involve dubbing a foreign language release into English and/or Spanish, and replacing the soundtrack with one composed by Mark Mercury.

 Adventures of Sinbad the Sailor — Producer
 The Adventures of Spunky and Tadpole — Distributor
 Candy Candy — Producer
 Captain Future — Distributor, Producer
 Space Pirate Captain Harlock — Producer
 Clutch Cargo — Distributor
 Fables of the Green Forest — Distributor, Producer
 Gaiking — Producer
 Flower Angel — Distributor, Producer
 Force Five — Distributor
 The Gumby Show — Distributor
 James Dean: The First American Teenager — Distributor
 King Arthur & the Knights of the Round Table — Distributor
 Little Lulu and Her Little Friends — Distributor, Producer
 Little Memole — Distributor, Producer
 Magnos the Robot — Producer
 Nickel Mountain — Distributor
 Space Angel — Distributor
 Sci-Fi West Saga Starzinger — Producer
 Zukkoke Knight - Don De La Mancha'' — Distributor

References

External links
 

Mass media companies established in 1971
Television production companies of the United States